Kyeong Jae-seok (born September 26, 2000) is a South Korean figure skater. He is the 2022 South Korean national bronze medalist, the 2017 South Korean national junior silver medalist, and the 2017 Asian Open Trophy junior bronze medalist. He finished 14th at the 2022 Four Continents Championships.

Programs

Competitive highlights
CS: Challenger Series; JGP: Junior Grand Prix

Detailed results

 Personal best highlighted in bold.

References

Further reading
 
 2017 ISU JGP Latvia Results
 2017 Asian Open Trophy Results
 2016 CS Lombardia Trophy Results

External links
 

2000 births
Living people
South Korean male single skaters
Sportspeople from Gyeonggi Province
21st-century South Korean people